Gaya Prasad Kori (1950 - 1996) was an Indian politician and former Member of Parliament of 10th Lok Sabha from Jalaun constituency, Uttar Pradesh.

Other posts held 
 1965, Chief instructor of Rashtriya Swayamsevak Sangh, Lalitpur
 1985, Member of legislative assembly, Uttar Pradesh
 1988 - 1990, Organising secretary of Vishwa Hindu Parishad
 1990 onwards, Propagandist of Rashtriya Swayamsevak Sangh, Jalaun district

References 

1950 births
1996 deaths